= Hurt v The King =

Judgement of the High Court of Australia

- Court: High Court of Australia
- Full case name: Hurt v The King
- Decided: 13 March 2024
- Citation: [2024] HCA 8

Hurt v The King is a 2024 decision of the High Court of Australia.

The case concerned how sentencing courts should treat mandatory minimum sentences in Australia.

An important finding in the case was that 'mandatory minimum' sentences are able to be discounted below the amounts stated in legislation. For example, a conviction under legislation with a mandatory minimum of four years still might result in a lesser sentence; if there are reasons to discount that four year amount. (e.g. a 25% discount on sentence for pleading guilty).
